The Ngatiawa River is a river on the Kapiti Coast of New Zealand's North Island that is a major tributary of the Waikanae River.  Its headwaters are in the Tararua Range and it flows north and northwest through the Akatarawa Valley to Reikorangi, where it meets the Waikanae River.

References

Rivers of the Wellington Region
Rivers of New Zealand